Piz Titschal is a mountain of the Swiss Lepontine Alps, located south of Obersaxen in the canton of Graubünden.

References

External links
 Piz Titschal on Hikr

Mountains of the Alps
Mountains of Graubünden
Lepontine Alps
Mountains of Switzerland
Two-thousanders of Switzerland
Obersaxen Mundaun